Nevado Tres Cruces is a massif of volcanic origin in the Andes Mountains on the border of Argentina and Chile. Tres Cruces Sur is the sixth highest mountain in the Andes.

The volcano has an extended history of activity, going back at least 1.5 million years. A number of lava domes surround the complex and a number of craters lie on its summits. The main volcano is of rhyodacitic composition and has generated two major ignimbritic eruptions, one 1.5 million years ago and a second 67,000 years ago. The last eruption was 28,000 years ago, but the volcano is a candidate source for a Holocene eruption and could erupt again in the future.

Geography and geomorphology 

Nevado Tres Cruces is located in the High Andes of Copiapo and straddles the boundary between Chile (Atacama Region) and Argentina (Catamarca Province). The Salar de Maricunga is located west of Nevado Tres Cruces, the Almagro valley north and its tributary the Barrancas Blancas valley northeast of it. The international road between Chile and Argentina from Paso de San Francisco passes north of Nevado Tres Cruces; an unpaved road runs through the Barrancas Blancas valley.

The southern summit consists of two overlapping cones, the western and older one of which has two explosion craters while the eastern one is capped by a summit lava dome. There are two even more minor summits at the north end of the massif, Punta Torre  and Punta Atacama .

The volcanoes are formed by explosion craters, lava domes including couleés, lava flows, tephra, and base surge and pyroclastic flow deposits. Fallout of explosive eruptions cover the slopes of the southern summit and deposits of a large Plinian eruption and its eruption column cover much of Nevado Tres Cruces and its surroundings. Normal faults cut across the volcanic structures and a north-northwest trending fault system appears to have directed the development of the three volcanoes.

Another lava dome is known as Domo las Vicuñas. The ignimbrite consists of pumice and volcanic ash, is poorly welded and has a low crystal content.

These edifices rise over older volcanoes, which crop out north of Nevado Tres Cruces in the form of the volcanoes Cristi ( high), Lemp and Rodrigo. The latter has a caldera at  elevation. Lemp is located just south of Rodrigo. Puntiagudo crops out south of Nevado Tres Cruces. The older structures are smoothened by erosion and lack primary features. Three older lava domes, all heavily eroded, are found on the western flank.

Glaciation 

Small glaciers occur on Nevado Tres Cruces on the eastern and southern sides above  elevation. They are best developed above  elevation and consist of small ice bodies (none exceeding ) in glacial cirques and at the edges of lava flows. One of these is hosted in a cirque on the southeastern flank of the southern summit. Ice area was constant between 1937 and 1956 but declined by almost half between 1985 and 2016. Non-moving ice without crevasses has been found on the northern summit, and there are debris-covered glaciers on the volcanoes.  Some sources however deny that any glacier occurs on Nevado Tres Cruces. 

Moraines occur above  elevation and a well-developed terminal moraine at the foot of Nevado Tres Cruces, at  elevation, has been broken by the Lamas River.

Geology 

The subduction has given rise to three volcanic belts in the Andes, from north to south these are the Northern Volcanic Zone, the Central Volcanic Zone (CVZ) and the Southern Volcanic Zone. These are separated by gaps where Pleistocene and Holocene volcanism is absent and where the downgoing plate sinks into the mantle at a shallow angle, squeezing out the overlying asthenosphere.

Nevado Tres Cruces is part of the CVZ, which spans Peru, Bolivia, Argentina and Chile and features over 1100 volcanoes. These old but uneroded volcanoes comprise both stratovolcanoes and lava dome complexes, as well as monogenetic volcanoes and calderas which have produced large ignimbrites. Among the better known volcanoes are Acamarachi, Aguas Calientes, Arintica, Aucanquilcha, Cerro Bajo, Cerro Escorial, Chiliques, Colachi, Cordon de Puntas Negras, Escalante, Guallatiri, Guayaques, Irruputuncu, Isluga, Lascar, Lastarria, Licancabur, Llullaillaco, Olca-Paruma, Ollagüe, Ojos del Salado, Parinacota, Pular, Putana, San Pedro, Sierra Nevada de Lagunas Bravas, Socompa, Taapaca and Tacora. These volcanoes are remote and thus, aside from potential impacts of ash clouds on aerial travel, they do not constitute a major threat to humans.

Nevado Tres Cruces together with neighbouring El Fraile, El Muertito, El Muerto, El Solo, Nevado de Incahuasi, Nevado San Francisco and Ojos del Salado forms the Ojos del Salado volcanic chain. It is a group of mostly dacitic volcanoes that is oblique with respect to the local trend of Pleistocene-Holocene volcanoes and was active during the last one million years. During the Oligocene and Miocene volcanic activity occurred in the Maricunga Belt, then around 6 million years ago it migrated eastward. South of Nevado Tres Cruces lies the Los Patos volcano.

Composition 

Nevado Tres Cruces has erupted rocks ranging from dacite to rhyodacite which define a potassium-rich calc-alkaline suite. They feature biotite and hornblende phenocrysts and there is evidence that magma mixing took place during the genesis of the magmas. Older volcanic rocks are andesites with clinopyroxene, hornblende, labradorite and orthopyroxene as phenocryst phases. The occurrence of obsidian has been reported.

Climate and vegetation 

Strong winds, intense insolation, high diurnal and seasonal temperature variations characterize the region. At high elevations, precipitation falls mainly in winter in the form of snow and hail. The lack of visible life in the hyperarid region has led to numerous travellers deeming it a "lunar landscape". There are wetlands associated with the Rio Lamas on Nevado Tres Cruces. The area is part of the Nevado Tres Cruces National Park created in 1994.

Eruption history 

Nevado Tres Cruces was active during the Pliocene and Pleistocene, with the oldest activity pre-dating 1.5 million years ago. Potassium-argon dating has yielded ages of 3.4±0.5 and 4.9±0.4 million years ago. Rodrigo erupted 4.4±0.6 million years ago, Lemp 2.8±0.3 million years ago and Cristi 2.5±1.3 million years ago. The three western lava domes were emplaced 2.1±0.3 million years ago. The western lava flow is dated to be 1.4±0.4 million years old. The well-preserved Indio and La Espinilla lava domes were erupted 350,000±40,000 and 168,000±6,000 years ago, respectively. Volcanic activity took place in two stages separated by a long pause,.

1.5 million years ago an explosive eruption produced pyroclastic flows in the western part of the volcano. The flows are now covered with glacial and alluvial sediments and form a fan. A large explosive eruption 67,000±9,000 years ago deposited pyroclastic flows east and southeast of Nevado Tres Cruces.

Most recent eruption and hazards 

The last eruption 28,000±22,000 years ago produced the summit dome of the southern summit. There are no known historical eruptions and the volcano is not considered to be active.

Based on geochemical data, Nevado Tres Cruces has been proposed as the source of a tephra layer in the Bolson de Fiambalá that has also been identified in the Tafi del Valle area and the Valles Calchaquies. The eruption producing this tephra fall took place about 600-700 AD. Archeological observations in the Fiambalá region indicates that this tephra fall event had substantial impact on local communities.

Notes

References

Sources

External links
 
 
 Andes Handbook (Spanish)
 Tres Cruces (Spanish) 

Volcanoes of Atacama Region
Volcanoes of Catamarca Province
Mountains of Argentina
Mountains of Chile
Argentina–Chile border
International mountains of South America
Six-thousanders of the Andes